The Melodeers are an all-female, a cappella barbershop harmony chorus based in the metropolitan Chicago area.

History
Founded in 1960 in Deerfield, Illinois, the Melodeers Chorus is an a cappella chorus of female singers who sing in the barbershop style. Based in Northbrook, Illinois, they are the seven-time International Champion Chorus of Sweet Adelines International, the world's largest singing organization for women, with over 25,000 members worldwide. More than 600 choruses compete each year in regional contests to qualify for the international contest to determine the International Champion Chorus.

The Melodeers have won the championship title in the years 2014, 2011, 2008, 2003, 2000, 1997, and 1994. Choruses placing first in the international contest are required to sit out regional qualifying contests for two years after winning. Their most recent win was in Baltimore on November 8, 2014, with a score of 3129.  They are the current international Third Place bronze medalist chorus.

The Melodeers are directed by Jim Arns, who was honored in 2009 by Sweet Adelines International with the designation "Master Director 700", given only to the directors of choruses scoring 700 points or better in regional contests. Jim earned his Bachelor of Music degree at Benedictine University in Illinois and his Master of Music from Northwestern University, also in Illinois. He has directed the Melodeers since 1988.

The chorus is made up of approximately 130 singers, ranging in age from 16 to 80. Members hail not only from the Chicago metropolitan area, but from downstate Illinois, Indiana, Michigan, and Wisconsin. Members—homemakers, business owners, attorneys, medical and health professionals, to name a few of their backgrounds—are united by their love of singing and a desire to learn more about vocal production, women's barbershop singing, and showmanship.

Members of the chorus have given their talents to assist others in their musical education. Some members serve currently on the Sweet Adelines International Board of Directors, the International Faculty, the International Judging Program, and on the Management Team of the SAI Lake Michigan Region 3 board. Some members of the chorus also sing in quartets, four of which—Jubilation, the Melo-Edge, Chicago Fire, and the Four Bettys—were named Sweet Adelines International Champion Quartets.

The Melodeers typically produce two shows each year: one in late spring, and one celebrating the December holiday season. The Melodeers have performed at Ravinia Festival and have sung the National Anthem several times at games of the Chicago Cubs. The chorus also sponsors a Young Women in Harmony Festival for high-school singers each spring.

The Melodeers have been the recipients of grants from the National Endowment for the Arts, the Illinois Arts Council and the Young Singers Foundation, official charity of Sweet Adelines International.

References

External links 
 

A cappella musical groups
Choirs in Illinois
American vocal groups
Sweet Adelines International
Musical groups established in 1960
Northbrook, Illinois
Women's musical groups
Deerfield, Illinois
1960 establishments in Illinois
Women in Illinois